Voodoo Moon is a 2006 horror film written and directed by comic book artist and writer Kevin VanHook. It aired as a Sunday night movie on the Sci-Fi channel on June 4, 2006.

Plot synopsis
A demonic being destroys an entire town, save a young boy and his sister. Twenty years later, the sister is an artist with psychic abilities and her brother has grown obsessed with tracking down the demon who took out his town. Together, they fight to destroy the evil being that could kill them both.

Cast
 Eric Mabius as Cole 
 Charisma Carpenter as Heather 
 Rik Young as Daniel 
 Jeffrey Combs as Frank Taggert 
 Jayne Heitmeyer as Lola 
 Dee Wallace as Mary-Ann 
 John Amos as "Dutch"
 Reynaldo Gallegos as Ray (as Rey Gallegos) 
 Kimberly Hawthorne as Diana (as Kim Hawthorne) 
 David Jean Thomas as Jean-Pierre 
 Kelley Hazen as Helen Taggert 
 Geoffrey Lewis as Old Man #1 
 Vernon Duckett as Old Man #2 
 Frank Collison as Mac 
 Alison Lees-Taylor as Sally 
 Jason Rodriguez as Bobby 
 Cathrine Grace as Art Gallery Patron 
 Merritt Bailey as Lola's Husband 
 James DiStefano as Cab Driver 
 Cameron VanHook as Skinned Old Man 
 Georgia Anderson as Crucified Brunette Girl 
 Anissa Briggs as Girl At Cemetery 
 Mary Ann Farkas as Old Lady with Fork 
 Cathy Fitzpatrick as Art Gallery Patron 
 Michael Lloyd Gilliland as Biker Leader (as Michael Gilliland) 
 Vester Grayson as Rocking Chair Demon 
 Lauren M. Higgs as Young Woman At Motel 
 Keegan Holst as Boy With Scissors 
 Paul Latham as Zombie 
 Alexis Longo as Scared Girl 
 Justin Ordman as Tom 
 Brian O'Sullivan as Thief 
 Blair Redford as Evil Young Man 
 Kevin VanHook as Cemetery Gardener 
 Scott Whyte as Billy 
 David Keith Anderson as Demon (uncredited)

References

External links
 
 
 

2000s supernatural horror films
2006 films
2006 horror films
2006 television films
American horror television films
American supernatural horror films
2000s American films